Senator Gooch may refer to:

Steve Gooch (born 1967), Georgia State Senate
U. L. Gooch (born 1923), Kansas State Senate